Unfolding Rhythms is an outdoor 1987 sculpture by Manuel Izquierdo, located in Portland, Oregon, United States.

Description and history
Manuel Izquierdo's Unfolding Rhythms (1987) is an abstract painted metal sculpture, installed outside the Oregon Dental Services (ODS) Building on Southwest Fifth Avenue between Oak Street and Stark Street. It measures approximately  x  x . The sculpture was funded by ODS and is enclosed by a fence at night. An inscription on its northeast side reads, "" (the copyright date), and displays a copyright symbol with the artist's signature.

The sculpture was surveyed and considered "treatment needed" by the Smithsonian's "Save Outdoor Sculpture!" program in 1993.

Reception
Unfolding Rhythms has been included in at least one published walking tour of Portland.

See also

 1987 in art
 The Dreamer (1979), Portland, Oregon
 Silver Dawn (1980), Portland, Oregon

References

1987 establishments in Oregon
1987 sculptures
Abstract sculptures in Oregon
Outdoor sculptures in Portland, Oregon
Southwest Portland, Oregon